Feel Good About Your Body is an EP by American noise rock band Pussy Galore, released in 1985 by Adult Contemporary and Shove Records.

Track listing

Personnel
Adapted from the Feel Good About Your Body liner notes.

Pussy Galore
Julie Cafritz – electric guitar, backing vocals
John Hammill – drums, percussion
Jon Spencer – lead vocals, electric guitar, percussion

Production and additional personnel
Barrett Jones – production

Release history

References

External links 
 

1985 debut EPs
Pussy Galore (band) albums